The Akhmetelis Teatri (Officially known as Akhmeteli Theatre) is a northern terminus on the Akhmeteli–Varketili Line of the Tbilisi Metro. It opened on 7 January 1989.

The station was originally known as Gldani. It was renamed in 1992.

During the USSR, works began on a second exit, but was abandoned after the collapse of the USSR but plans to finish the second exit were introduced in 2022. 
As of 2022, EBRD and the Tbilisi Mayors Office announced that Akhmeteli Theatre would have it's second exit completed, and the infrastructure of the station would be adapted for people with disabilities.

References

External links
 Akhmeteli Theatre station page at Tbilisi Municipal Portal

Tbilisi Metro stations
Railway stations opened in 1989
1989 establishments in Georgia (country)